The Ottoman Empire's governors of Egypt from 1517 to 1805 were at various times known by different but synonymous titles, among them beylerbey, viceroy, governor, governor-general, or, more generally, wāli. Furthermore, the Ottoman sultans very often changed positions of their governors in rapid succession, leading to complex and long lists of incumbents (this being the main reason for a political crisis in 1623, where the local Ottoman soldiers successfully sued to keep Kara Mustafa Pasha as governor after his replacement by Çeşteci Ali Pasha after only one year).

Governors ruled from the Cairo Citadel in Cairo. They ruled along with their divan (governmental council), consisting of a kadı (judge) and defterdar (treasurer). The title "beylerbey" refers to the regular governors specifically appointed to the post by the Ottoman sultan, while the title "kaymakam", when used in the context of Ottoman Egypt, refers to an acting governor who ruled over the province between the departure of the previous governor and the arrival of the next one. Although almost all governors were succeeded and preceded by a kaymakam due to the traveling distance from their old post to Egypt, only the most notable are included in this list.

Below is a list of Ottoman wālis of the Egypt Eyalet of the Ottoman Empire from 1517 (the Ottoman conquest of Egypt) to 1805 (the beginning of the Muhammad Ali dynasty; see list of monarchs of the Muhammad Ali dynasty). Governors of Egypt after 1805 are not included in this list because, although they were still nominally and officially Ottoman governors of the province, they assumed the monarchical title "Khedive" that was unrecognized by the central Ottoman government and passed the role in a hereditary fashion. Acting governors (kaymakams) are not included in the numbering.

See also
 List of monarchs of the Muhammad Ali Dynasty, 1805–1953
 Egypt Province, Ottoman Empire
 History of Ottoman Egypt
 Lists of rulers of Egypt

Notes

References

Main sources



 
Ottoman governors of Egypt
Ottoman governors of Egypt
Crete